AOL Radio powered by Slacker (formerly AOL Radio powered by CBS Radio, and prior AOL Radio featuring XM) was an online radio service available in the United States only.  It had over 200 free internet radio stations.

History

Roots 
AOL Radio can trace its roots to two companies it acquired on June 1, 1999, for $400 million: Spinner.com and Nullsoft. Spinner.com was formerly known as TheDJ.com.  Nullsoft was the maker of the popular Winamp and SHOUTcast products.  Both new organizations operated out of the same office in San Francisco.  The Spinner.com brand was retired in July 2003.

AOL Radio launched as Radio@AOL, essentially a rebranded Spinner.com, using technology from RealNetworks on October 16, 2001 as part of the AOL 7.0 software announced that same day.

In its first month of operation, AOL reported that 2.2 million members accessed Radio@AOL, making it one of AOL's most popular features.

Initially, Radio@AOL was available only to AOL members. On May 22, 2002, AOL released the free Radio@Netscape for non-members as part of the new Netscape 7.0 browser. On August 22, 2002, AOL released Radio@Netscape Plus.  Beginning in 2004, AOL started metering Radio@Netscape to allow only two hours of usage per day.  AOL did this to avoid paying copyright royalties and to encourage users to become AOL members.

On November 28, 2007, AOL announced that they might shut down their web radio services after a 38 percent increase in royalties to air music. Yahoo! and AOL discontinued directing users to their radio sites after SoundExchange, the non-profit performance rights organization that collects royalties on the behalf of sound recording copyright owners (SRCOs) and featured artists for non-interactive digital transmissions, began collecting the higher fees in July.

Partnership with CBS Radio 
On April 30, 2008, XM and AOL Radio ended their partnership due to the change in Internet royalty rates and formed a new alliance with CBS Radio. This announcement coincidentally came months before XM merged with Sirius Satellite Radio to form the present-day Sirius XM service. On June 10, 2008, a new AOL Radio player debuted with AOL's 150 pre-programmed stations as well as CBS's live and local music, news/talk, and sports stations. It also enabled song skipping (limited to 6 per hour) for its users, though it's not applicable on live stations. It also allowed users unlimited presets to their favorite stations as well as access to personal songs history. It was available as an app for iPhone and iOS users in the months that followed.

During its time, AOL Radio was mostly available to broadband users. However, AOL made adjustments to its radio player to also be accessible to dial-up/narrowband users.

On February 4, 2010, AOL Radio banned users outside the U.S. from streaming online radio. An error message pointed to Last FM. "We're sorry, this station is unavailable from your current location. Instead, enjoy listening to...." Later AOL Radio content became featured on CBS Radio's Radio.com when the site launched (as of March 2021, this service is now known as Audacy).

Partnership with Slacker 
In October 2011, AOL ended its partnership with CBS Radio and became partners with Slacker, moving AOL's 250 pre-programmed stations to the new service. Listeners also accessed news and sports updates from ABC News Radio and ESPN Radio respectively. This changeover, however, required iPhone/iOS users to update or download the new "AOL Radio" app when it became available. The app was also made available to Android users months later. This new format allowed users to customize their stations based on their favorite songs/artists and share them with their friends. It also allowed songs to be favorited or banned (rather than using an out-of-five rating system) and allowed songs/artists to be banned altogether. To rate and create customized stations, AOL users would have to sign up with Slacker.

Though the service was free with limited song-skipping and fewer commercials, they offered two different subscription plans--Radio Plus and Premium Radio tiers, both of which offered ad-free radio and unlimited song-skipping and offline listening, with on-demand listening for the latter tier. In July 2013, AOL Radio updated the site's look to match that of its parent company Slacker Radio. AOL Radio was merged with Slacker Radio and discontinued on December 1, 2017. In the years that followed, Slacker was changed to "LiveXLive" and as of October 6, 2021, it was renamed LiveOne.

Marketing 
On November 18, 2002, AOL introduced Broadband Radio@AOL.  Broadband Radio@AOL was built into the AOL 8.0 software, and was the first AOL Radio offering based on the AOL streaming technology Ultravox. By 2003, AOL had migrated most of its AOL Radio products to Ultravox. It was released in the UK on October 20, 2003.

On April 11, 2005, AOL and XM Satellite Radio joined together to create Radio@AOL featuring XM.  At the same time, AOL consolidated Radio@AOL and Radio@Netscape as "Radio@AOL featuring XM".  This service was available to AOL members and non-members alike, with twenty XM channels offered (fifty more XM channels require a paying AOL subscription).  Later in 2005, AOL changed the name of Radio@AOL to AOL Radio to align itself with the AOL Music branding.  In July 2005, a web version of AOL Radio was introduced for non-members with unlimited listening.  At the end of 2005, Radio@Netscape was officially retired, with AOL Radio being the official brand.

On April 30, 2008, AOL and XM Satellite Radio announced the end of their partnership and the beginning of the new partnership between AOL and CBS Radio. The partnership between AOL and CBS Radio would give AOL access to over 150 of CBS Radio's terrestrial stations.

On June 10, 2008, the AOL CBS player for AIM was released. On June 11, 2008, the new AOL CBS Radio player for the web was released.

Technology 
AOL Radio powered by CBS Radio was supported on Adobe Flash 9 and was compatible with web browsers that supported Flash 9 on Windows 2000 through Windows Vista and Mac OS X.

Listeners could connect to AOL Radio through the web, AOL Client, and AOL Radio for Mac. On July 10, 2008, AOL released a client for Apple's iPhone and iPod Touch via the App Store offering mobile streaming of all stations though WiFi, EDGE and 3G cellular connections. AOL Radio was also available through the AOL Instant Messenger service, and Winamp.

Limits with basic account 
 Video ads when the player is opened and when stations are changed several times
 No rewind, fast-forward, or playback
 No ratings system; songs can only be banned or favorited.
 A maximum of six skips per station per hour; changing stations, refreshing the page, banning a song or artist (even if the song has already played), or reloading the player will use a skip
 As of February 2012, the next song cannot be previewed
 Only the lyrics of the first verse (or so) of each song can be viewed
 Occasional commercial breaks
 A limited number of songs on the listening history; if a song or artist is banned, once that song disappears from the history list, it is gone from that station forever

Notable DJs, mixers, personalities 
 CJ Hebb
 DJ AM
 Chris Douridas

See also 

 Live365
 LAUNCHcast
 SHOUTcast
 Slacker (music service)

References

External links 
 
 AOL Radio Blog

Internet radio stations in the United States
Radio
IOS software
macOS media players
Windows multimedia software
Multimedia software for Linux
Radio stations established in 2000
Radio stations disestablished in 2017
Defunct radio stations in the United States